This article shows the rosters of all participating teams at the 2021 Asian Championship in Japan.

Pool A

The following is the Japanese roster in the 2021 Asian Men's Volleyball Championship.

Head Coach:  Yuichi Nakagaichi

The following is the Indian roster in the 2021 Asian Men's Volleyball Championship.

Head Coach:   G. E. Sridharan

The following is the Qatari roster in the 2021 Asian Men's Volleyball Championship.

Head Coach:  Camilo Andres Soto

The following is the Bahraini roster in the 2021 Asian Men's Volleyball Championship.

Head Coach:   Marco Queiroga

Pool B

The following is the Iranian roster in the 2021 Asian Men's Volleyball Championship.

Head Coach:   Behrouz Ataei

The following is the Pakistani roster in the 2021 Asian Men's Volleyball Championship.

Head Coach:   Rahman Mohammadirad

The following is the Thai roster in the 2021 Asian Men's Volleyball Championship.

Head Coach:   Titiracht Kasudom

The following is the Hong Kong roster in the 2021 Asian Men's Volleyball Championship.

Head Coach:   Hok Chun Yau

Pool C

The following is the Australian roster in the 2021 Asian Men's Volleyball Championship.

Head Coach:  Marcos Miranda

The following is the Chinese roster in the 2021 Asian Men's Volleyball Championship.

Head Coach:  Wu Sheng

The following is the Uzbekistani roster in the 2021 Asian Men's Volleyball Championship.

Head Coach:   Zokir Nosirov

The following is the Kuwaiti roster in the 2021 Asian Men's Volleyball Championship.

Head Coach:  Aleksandar Senicic

Pool D

The following is the Korean roster in the 2021 Asian Men's Volleyball Championship.

Head Coach:  Park Sam-ryong

The following is the Chinese Taipei roster in the 2021 Asian Men's Volleyball Championship.

Head Coach:  Moro Branislav

The following is the Kazakhstani roster in the 2021 Asian Men's Volleyball Championship.

Head Coach:

The following is the Saudi Arabian roster in the 2021 Asian Men's Volleyball Championship.

Head Coach:  Vladan Avramovic

References

External links 

Asian Men's Volleyball Championship
International volleyball competitions hosted by Japan
Asian Men's Volleyball Championship
September 2021 sports events in Asia